Bassini is a surname of Italian origin. The name may refer to:
Achille De Bassini (1819–1881), Italian operatic baritone
Edoardo Bassini (1844–1924), Italian surgeon; noted for surgical procedure for repairing hernias
Rubens Bassini (1933–1985), Brazilian musician and percussionist
Laurence Bassini (born 1970),  English businessman

Italian-language surnames